The North Carolina General Assembly of 18681869 met in Raleigh from November 16, 1868 to April 12, 1869 with a special session from July 1, 1868 to August 24, 1868. This was the first assembly to meet after the approval of the new Constitution of North Carolina in 1868. As prescribed in this constitution, the assembly consisted of the 120 members in the North Carolina House of Representatives and 43 senators in the North Carolina Senate elected by the voters on August 6, 1868. This assembly was in control of the Republican Party and was dominated by reconstruction era politics.

Changes in assembly from the North Carolina Constitution of 1868
The Constitution of North Carolina was rewritten at the North Carolina Constitutional Convention of 1868, which met in Raleigh from January 14 to March 17, 1868. The House of Commons was renamed the House of Representatives. The new constitution spelled out that the legislature would convene annually on the third Monday in November. The number of senators was set as 50. There would be one or two senators for each district composed of one or more counties. The boundaries of the districts would be re-evaluated in 1871 after the federal census. A state census was required every 10 years, beginning in 1875. This census would be used to re-evaluate the districts, so that an approximate equal number of residents would be included in each district. The House of Representatives was set at 120 members. Each county would have at least one representative and some counties would have up to four representatives, based on population. The population would not include non-taxed Indians or aliens. Elections would be held the first Thursday of August. The terms of the members of the house and senate would commence when elected and continue till the next election.

The lieutenant governor was designated as the President of the Senate, albeit without a vote unless there was a tie vote. A president pro temp would be elected by the senators to serve in the absence of the lieutenant governor.

The 1868 Constitution included provisions to establish public education for the first time, prohibit slavery, and adopt universal suffrage. It also provided for public welfare institutions for the first time: orphanages, public charities and a penitentiary.

In January 1868, at the same time as the Constitutional Convention, a Black Caucus came together in Raleigh. Many of these members would be elected to the 1860 General Assembly.

In April 1868, voters of North Carolina ratified the new constitution.

Legislation
This assembly met in regular session from November 16, 1868 to April 12, 1869. They met in an extra session from July 1, 1868 to August 24, 1868. The assembly ratified the Fourteenth Amendment to the United States Constitution, as required by the United States Congress, on July 4, 1868. Ratification of the Fourteenth amendment readmitted North Carolina to the United States. This assembly also ratified the Fifteenth Amendment. In anticipation of readmission to the U.S. Congress, on June 25, 1868, the assembly elected John Pool of Elizabeth City and Joseph Carter Abbott of Wilmington to the United States Senate. The state's first public school systems, one for blacks and one for whites, was created by this assembly. Funding for the first state penitentiary, Central Prison was authorized by this legislature.

Every Southern state subsidized railroads, which modernizers believed could haul the South out of isolation and poverty. Millions of dollars in bonds and subsidies were fraudulently pocketed. One ring in North Carolina spent $200,000 in bribing the legislature and obtained millions in state money for its railroads. Instead of building new track, however, it used the funds to speculate in bonds, reward friends with extravagant fees, and enjoy lavish trips to Europe.

For additional details on legislation, see Legislative Documents.

Assembly membership
This was the first assembly that Blacks were represented in the assembly, including three Black senators and 18 representatives in the House of Representatives.

House of Representatives members

The House of Representative delegates elected a speaker (Joseph W. Holden, William A. Moore), clerk, assistant clerk (John H. Boner), doorkeeper, and assistant doorkeeper. Alleghany, Clay, Mitchell, Polk, Transylvania, and Wilson counties sent delegates to the assembly for the first time. The following delegates to the House of Representatives were elected by the voters of North Carolina to represent each county and district:

Senate members

The lieutenant governor, Tod Robinson Caldwell, served as president of the Senate when it was in session. The senators elected a president pro tem (Charles S. Winstead), clerk (T. A. Brynes), assistant clerk (William M. Barrow), doorkeeper (J. T. Ball), and assistant doorkeeper (Francis W. Gibble). The following senators were elected by the voters of North Carolina to represent the numbered districts:

Notes

References

1868
General Assembly
 1868
 1868
1868 U.S. legislative sessions